Scottsburg is an unincorporated community in Monroe Township, Pike County, in the U.S. state of Indiana.

Geography

References

Unincorporated communities in Pike County, Indiana
Unincorporated communities in Indiana